is a 2001 Japanese movie directed by Isamu Nakae, starring Yutaka Takenouchi and Kelly Chen. It is a love story about two students who met at an art college in Japan. The film is based on a 1999 novel which was a best seller in Japan.  was a hit, becoming the 8th highest-grossing film in Japan of 2001.

The title tune is "Wild Child" from the album A Day Without Rain by Enya. An album of Enya's songs used in the film was released in 2001 as Themes from Calmi Cuori Appassionati.

Plot 

Living in Florence, Italy, in 1997, Junsei Agata is studying to be a restoration expert who specializes in fine art studying under his italian teacher Giovanna.Despite him dating Memi, a language school student in Italy, He feels life is empty. This is because he clings to the memory of Aoi, a girl from school he meets in 1990 in a record shop and dated. One day, he learns Aoi is in Milan and finds she lives with a wealthy American businessman Marvin Lai, who met her while talking about the painting of Junsei's grandfather. He finds she lives in a different world now from where he left and moved on, and returns to his restoration workshop, only to find out he is falsely charged with the vandalism of a Cigoli painting he was restoring. An exhausted Junsei returns home. The next day he confronts Takanashi for falsely framing him of vandalism, but turns out no one can catch the culprit.His italian teacher Giovanna comforts Junsei saying unlike her home italy who is stuck in the past and tries so hard to restore the past, He has a future. However, A traumatized Junsei, unwilling to get another restoration job, runs back to Japan.

In 1998, Junsei still is revealed to be missing Aoi, as Memi finds drawings of Aoi by Junsei in his house.Despite living together, Marvin and Aoi still is not married, unlike her friend Daniella who is marrying Lucas. Aoi receives a letter from Junsei, hiding it in a box.

Meanwhile, Junsei's grandfather Agata Seiji falls ill. Relationship with Memi is at an all time crisis, after she learns from Junsei's friend Takashi that Junsei once had a baby with Aoi but moved on. To talk these matters, Junsei talks with Takashi, and he replies love with true loves don't end up well.

Movie flashbacks to the point Junsei and Aoi break up because Aoi lost her baby without telling Junsei for her own reasons, which Junsei requests Aoi to break up.

As Seiji nears his death, family conflict regarding inheritance ensues, and one of the family members insults Aoi of having a baby with Junsei for money. Angry Junsei, fights that family member requesting him to apologize.

In 1999, Aoi replaces the painting of Junsei's grandfather with a new painting to move on from memories of Junsei. However, Marvin finds the letter from Junsei in her box and confronts her, doubting her motivations in the relationship with himself, saying her heart is not with him. Aoi decides to read the letter.

As she reads the letter, film flashes back to 1990, which reveals Junsei and Aoi's first encounter and how their dating went, as well as the fact that Aoi was always lonely girl who was struggling from her new married parents, and a girl who decided to study in Japan to reconnect with the heritage of his father despite her originally from overseas, and a girl who is trying to find her place in life. After reading Junsei's letter and realizing how Junsei truly understood and loved her, she finally calls Junsei but she  hangs up without saying anything and cries afterwards.

One day, Angello calls Junsei to tell Giovanna committed suicide without an unknown cause (though it is implied to be because Giovanna did not move on from her love to Junsei, who she had special attention to and treat him as her muse), and Junsei, as the marriage of Luca and Daniella is happening on the other side, reunites with Angello and Takahashi in a workshop. Takahashi finally reveals it was Giovanna that vandalised the painting, and the students framed him to protect their workshop  from being closed, and admits Takahashi and Giovanna was jealous of  Junsei's talents and his constant nature too much that they did not tell the authorities the truth. Takahashi also tells Junsei, Giovanna's love for Junsei and the workshop planning to be reopened.

In the year 2000, Junsei suddenly moves on from his life with Memi in Japan and decides to return to Italy as a restoration worker, and disappointed Memi breaks up with Junsei after knowing his heart is still with Aoi. Meanwhile, Aoi rides the plane to LA with his partner Marvin Lai.

In 2001, as Junsei restores the picture of Cigoli, he rejuvenates from his trauma from the vandalism incident and Junsei reminisce a 10-year promise with Aoi. When he was a college student in Japan, he made a promise with Aoi to meet on the top of the Duomo in Florence on her 30th birthday. He hangs on to one slight hope that Aoi must have remembered the promise. He decides to return to Florence to prove the love between him and Aoi is true at the top of the Duomo.Aoi takes Junsei to a string quartet concert, which plays the same song when they first kissed, and kisses, and make love. Aoi after realizing that her true love was Junsei all along, she refuses to return with Marvin to LA.However Junsei decides to live the "present", as he cannot fill his heart from her calm rejection of rekindling relationship (continuing till present and possibly future) with passion of a bygone past and nostalgia. (Thus the title, betwixt calm and passion, calmness more appropriately translated as cold) The film ends with the two looking at each other from afar in the crowd.

Cast 
 Yutaka Takenouchi as Agata Junsei
 Kelly Chen as Aoi
 Roberto Brunetti as Luca
 Valeria Cavalli as Giovanna
 Luciano Federico as Angelo
 Silvia Ferreri as Daniela
 Arnoldo Foà as The Restorer
 Reona Hirota as Asami
 Nana Katase
 Hisanori Koshimizu
 Tatsuo Matsumura as Seiji Agata, grandfather of Agata Junsei
 Ryôta Matsushima
 Marisa Merlini as Gina
 Shinya Owada as Kiyomasa Agata
 Kenichi Sano
 Yūsuke Santamaria as Takashi
 Kippei Shiina as Takanashi
 Ryoko Shinohara as Memi
 Sansei Shiomi as The Lawyer
 Michael Wong as Marvin Lai

Reception
The film opened at number one at the Japanese box office with an opening weekend gross of 279 million Yen ($2.3 million). It remained number one for a second week.

Award nominations
2002 Awards of the Japanese Academy
 Nomination - Best Actor - Yutaka Takenouchi
 Nomination - Best Cinematography - Toyoshi Tsuda
 Nomination - Best Lighting - Minoru Kawai

Notes

References

External links
 Official site (Japanese)
 IMDb entry

2001 films
2000s Japanese-language films
Films set in Florence
Films set in Milan
2000s Japanese films
Films produced by Kazutoshi Wadakura